The 1993 Currie Cup (known as the Bankfin Currie Cup for sponsorship reasons) was the 55th season in the competition since it started in 1889.

6 teams participated, playing each other twice over the course of the season, once at home and once away. Teams received two points for a win and one point for a draw. The top two teams qualified for the final.

This season saw no changes from the previous year.

Teams

Team listing

Log

Results
Northern Transvaal 34 - 20 Western Province
Northern Transvaal 27 - 14 Western Province
Northern Transvaal 15 - 37 Eastern Province
Northern Transvaal 18 - 12 Eastern Province
Northern Transvaal 16 - 19 Transvaal
Northern Transvaal 13 - 36 Transvaal
Northern Transvaal 20 - 40 Natal
Northern Transvaal 26 - 30 Natal
Northern Transvaal 29 - 37 Cheetahs
Northern Transvaal 27 - 18 Cheetahs

Final

External links
 Currie Cup Log 1993

References

 
1993 in South African rugby union
Currie